Lisa Carol Freemont is the second studio album by Washington, D.C. Indie band Unrest, released on August 29, 1985 by TeenBeat Records.

Track listing

Personnel
Adapted from the Lisa Carol Freemont liner notes.

Unrest
 Phil Krauth – drums, tambourine, bass guitar, backing vocals
 Tim Moran – bass guitar, guitar, synthesizer, drums, backing vocals
 Mark Robinson – lead vocals, guitar, piano, Casio CZ synthesizer, bass guitar, design

Additional musicians
 Tajinder Singh Chadha – backing vocals
 Suzie Longava – backing vocals
 Mike Swearingen – backing vocals
 Ian Zack – MC
Production and additional personnel
 Richard Ashman – production and engineering (A9)
 Mark Richard – production, recording

Release history

References

1985 albums
Unrest (band) albums
TeenBeat Records albums